The Violent Ones is a 1967 film directed by and starring Fernando Lamas. The story was written and created by Charles Davis, Fred Freiberger, Herman Miller, and Doug Wilson. The film was shot in the Alabama Hills, Mojave Desert and Lone Pine, California.

Plot
Juanita, a girl in a town that's populated by Hispanics, is raped and beaten. The only thing she says before falling into a deep coma is that her attacker is an outsider, a Gringo. Local Mexican-American Sheriff Vega arrests all three outsiders there are. All he can do is intimidating the prisoners so that one of them admits to being the attacker, or that the girl wake up to identify him. The girl dies, and her father prepares a lynch mob.

The sheriff can't get any help from the state, and even Mendoza, his deputy, is unwilling to help him. The sheriff takes the prisoners out of the jail in a trip to the closest city where they can be processed. But the prisoners, an unstable kid, a brutish man and a coldly intelligent youngster have other plans.

Cast 
Fernando Lamas – Manuel Vega
Aldo Ray – Joe Vorzyck
Tommy Sands – Mike Marain
David Carradine – Lucas Barnes
Ned Romero - Mendoza
Lisa Gaye – Dolores
Melinda Marx – Juanita
Rodolfo Acosta - Estévez

External links 

1967 films
1960s crime drama films
American crime drama films
Films about race and ethnicity
Films set in New Mexico
1960s English-language films
1960s American films